Angustura is an unincorporated community and census-designated place (CDP) in San Juan County, New Mexico, United States. It was first listed as a CDP prior to the 2020 census.

The CDP is in the northeast part of the county, bordered to the west by the city of Bloomfield and to the east by Blanco. The San Juan River forms the southern border of the community. U.S. Route 64 passes through Angustura, leading west through Bloomfield  to Farmington and east  to Dulce.

Demographics

Education 
The area school district is Bloomfield Schools. Bloomfield High School is the local high school.

References 

Census-designated places in San Juan County, New Mexico
Census-designated places in New Mexico